Zodarion pusio is a spider species found in Bosnia-Hercegovina, Croatia, France, Italy and Tunisia.

See also 
 List of Zodariidae species

References

External links 

pusio
Spiders of Europe
Spiders of North Africa
Spiders described in 1914